The Triumph of Christianity: How a Forbidden Religion Swept the World is a book by American New Testament scholar Bart D. Ehrman. Published on February 13, 2018, by Simon & Schuster, the book concerns the history of early Christianity and its spread throughout the world.

Reception
Tom Bissell, in his review of The Triumph of Christianity for The New York Times, commended both it and Ehrman's prior book The Orthodox Corruption of Scripture for showcasing Ehrman's "steadfast humanizing impulse". Bob Duffy of the Washington Independent Review of Books wrote that The Triumph of Christianity "remains solidly grounded in first-rate scholarship. And although a few loony emperors do lurk about and the (very) occasional persecution arises, the reader in search of the dramatic, the sentimental, or the miraculous is likely to find scant fulfillment here."

Paul W. Gleason, reviewing the book for Newsday, wrote that "Ehrman's conclusions are debatable, as he knows perfectly well. Like a good college lecture class, his book offers both a wealth of historical information and, to make sense of it all, a few plausible theories – including his own. He doesn't tell us what to think. He gives us a lot to think about."

The Wall Street Journals Douglas Boin called The Triumph of Christianity "a chipper but superficial retelling of the rise of Christianity."

References

2018 non-fiction books
Books by Bart D. Ehrman
History books about Christianity
Books about ancient Christianity
Early Christianity
History books about religion
Simon & Schuster books